The 2004–05 Dallas Stars season was their 38th National Hockey League season, and their 12th season in Dallas, however its games were cancelled as the 2004–05 NHL lockout could not be resolved in time.

Off-season
The Stars chose Mark Fistric with their first-round pick, 28th overall.

Schedule
The Stars preseason and regular season schedules were announced on July 12 and July 14, 2004, respectively.

|-
| 1 || September 25 || @ Colorado Avalanche
|-
| 2 || September 27 || Atlanta Thrashers
|-
| 3 || September 28 || @ St. Louis Blues
|-
| 4 || September 30 || Colorado Avalanche
|-
| 5 || October 2 || Detroit Red Wings
|-
| 6 || October 7 || @ Detroit Red Wings
|-
| 7 || October 9 || St. Louis Blues
|-

|-
| 1 || October 13 || @ Phoenix Coyotes
|-
| 2 || October 14 || Phoenix Coyotes
|-
| 3 || October 16 || Boston Bruins
|-
| 4 || October 20 || Nashville Predators
|-
| 5 || October 22 || Buffalo Sabres
|-
| 6 || October 24 || @ Chicago Blackhawks
|-
| 7 || October 27 || @ Detroit Red Wings
|-
| 8 || October 29 || Edmonton Oilers
|-
| 9 || October 30 || Columbus Blue Jackets
|-
| 10 || November 1 || Minnesota Wild
|-
| 11 || November 3 || Chicago Blackhawks
|-
| 12 || November 7 || @ Columbus Blue Jackets
|-
| 13 || November 10 || @ Carolina Hurricanes
|-
| 14 || November 12 || @ New Jersey Devils
|-
| 15 || November 13 || @ New York Islanders
|-
| 16 || November 16 || @ Toronto Maple Leafs
|-
| 17 || November 18 || @ Ottawa Senators
|-
| 18 || November 20 || Columbus Blue Jackets
|-
| 19 || November 23 || Anaheim Mighty Ducks
|-
| 20 || November 24 || @ Columbus Blue Jackets
|-
| 21 || November 26 || San Jose Sharks
|-
| 22 || November 28 || @ Anaheim Mighty Ducks
|-
| 23 || November 30 || @ Los Angeles Kings
|-
| 24 || December 2 || @ San Jose Sharks
|-
| 25 || December 4 || @ Phoenix Coyotes
|-
| 26 || December 8 || Philadelphia Flyers
|-
| 27 || December 11 || @ Minnesota Wild
|-
| 28 || December 13 || San Jose Sharks
|-
| 29 || December 15 || St. Louis Blues
|-
| 30 || December 17 || @ Washington Capitals
|-
| 31 || December 19 || @ Chicago Blackhawks
|-
| 32 || December 20 || @ Minnesota Wild
|-
| 33 || December 22 || Anaheim Mighty Ducks
|-
| 34 || December 26 || @ Nashville Predators
|-
| 35 || December 27 || Detroit Red Wings
|-
| 36 || December 29 || Los Angeles Kings
|-
| 37 || December 31 || Colorado Avalanche
|-
| 38 || January 2 || @ Tampa Bay Lightning
|-
| 39 || January 4 || Phoenix Coyotes
|-
| 40 || January 6 || @ San Jose Sharks
|-
| 41 || January 8 || @ Vancouver Canucks
|-
| 42 || January 11 || @ Calgary Flames
|-
| 43 || January 13 || @ Edmonton Oilers
|-
| 44 || January 15 || @ Montreal Canadiens
|-
| 45 || January 17 || @ Detroit Red Wings
|-
| 46 || January 19 || Nashville Predators
|-
| 47 || January 21 || Detroit Red Wings
|-
| 48 || January 23 || @ Atlanta Thrashers
|-
| 49 || January 25 || Calgary Flames
|-
| 50 || January 26 || @ Colorado Avalanche
|-
| 51 || January 28 || @ San Jose Sharks
|-
| 52 || January 31 || Los Angeles Kings
|-
| 53 || February 2 || Minnesota Wild
|-
| 54 || February 5 || @ St. Louis Blues
|-
| 55 || February 7 || Anaheim Mighty Ducks
|-
| 56 || February 9 || Chicago Blackhawks
|-
| 57 || February 16 || Colorado Avalanche
|-
| 58 || February 19 || @ St. Louis Blues
|-
| 59 || February 20 || Washington Capitals
|-
| 60 || February 23 || @ Los Angeles Kings
|-
| 61 || February 25 || @ Anaheim Mighty Ducks
|-
| 62 || February 27 || Vancouver Canucks
|-
| 63 || March 2 || Calgary Flames
|-
| 64 || March 4 || @ Colorado Avalanche
|-
| 65 || March 6 || Carolina Hurricanes
|-
| 66 || March 9 || New York Rangers
|-
| 67 || March 11 || Los Angeles Kings
|-
| 68 || March 12 || @ Nashville Predators
|-
| 69 || March 14 || Tampa Bay Lightning
|-
| 70 || March 16 || Pittsburgh Penguins
|-
| 71 || March 18 || Edmonton Oilers
|-
| 72 || March 20 || Vancouver Canucks
|-
| 73 || March 23 || Florida Panthers
|-
| 74 || March 26 || @ Anaheim Mighty Ducks
|-
| 75 || March 28 || @ Los Angeles Kings
|-
| 76 || March 30 || @ Vancouver Canucks
|-
| 77 || April 1 || @ Edmonton Oilers
|-
| 78 || April 2 || @ Calgary Flames
|-
| 79 || April 4 || San Jose Sharks
|-
| 80 || April 6 || Phoenix Coyotes
|-
| 81 || April 8 || @ Phoenix Coyotes
|-
| 82 || April 10 || St. Louis Blues
|-

Transactions
The Stars were involved in the following transactions from June 8, 2004, the day after the deciding game of the 2004 Stanley Cup Finals, through February 16, 2005, the day the  season was officially cancelled.

Trades

Players acquired

Players lost

Signings

Draft picks
Dallas' picks at the 2004 NHL Entry Draft, which was held at the RBC Center in Raleigh, North Carolina on June 26–27, 2004.

Notes

References

Dall
Dall
Dallas Stars seasons